Protostega ('first roof') is an extinct genus of sea turtle containing a single species, Protostega gigas. Its fossil remains have been found in the Smoky Hill Chalk formation of western Kansas (Hesperornis zone, dated to 83.5 million years ago), time-equivalent beds of the Mooreville Chalk Formation of Alabama and Campanian beds of the Rybushka Formation (Saratov Oblast, Russia). Fossil specimens of this species were first collected in 1871, and named by Edward Drinker Cope in 1872.

Discovery and History 

The first known Protostega specimen (YPM 1408) was collected on July 4 by the 1871 Yale College Scientific Expedition, close to Fort Wallace and about 5 months before Cope arrived in Kansas. However the fossil that they found was never described or named. It wasn't until E. D. Cope found and collected the first specimen of Protostega gigas in the Kansas chalk in 1871. A variety of bones were found in yellow cretaceous chalk from a bluff near Butte Creek.

Paleoenvironment 
The Late Cretaceous was marked by high temperatures, with large epicontinental seaways. During the Mid-to Late Cretaceous period the Western Interior Seaway covered the majority of North America and would connect to the Boreal and Tethyan oceans at times. Within these regions are where the fossil of Protostega gigas have been found.

Description 
Despite lacking its head and three limbs, it is well-preserved. Cope's Protostega gigas discovery reveled that their shell had a reduction of ossification that helped these huge animals with streamlining in the water and weight reduction. The carapace was greatly reduced and the disk only extending less than half way towards the distal ends of the ribs. Cope described other greatly modified bones in his specimen including an extremely long coracoid process that reached all the way to the pelvis and a humerus that resembled a Dermochelys. Creating better movement of their limbs.

Skull Structure: Edward Cope described the uniqued Protostega gigas to have a large jugal that reached to the quadrate along with a thickened pterygoid that reached to the mandibular articulating surface of the quadrate. The fossil featured a reduction in the posterior portion of the vomer where the palatines meet medially. Another fossilized specimen showed a bony extension, that would have been viewed as a beak, was lacking in the Protostega genus. The premaxillary beak was very shorter than that of Archelon. In front of the orbital region was elongated with broadly roofed temporal region. The jaws of the fossil showed a large crushing -surfaces. The quadrato-jugal was triangular with a posterior edge that was concave and the entire bone was convex from distal view. The squamosal appeared to have a concave formation on the surface at the upper end of the quadrate. In Cope's fossil the mandible was preserved almost perfectly and from this he recorded that the jaw was very similar to the Chelonidae and the dentary had a broad for above downward with a concave surface, marked by deep pits in the dentary.
Cope concluded that these animals were most likely omnivores and consumed a diet of hard shelled crustacean creatures, due to the long symphysis of its lower jaw. Along with probably consisted of seaweed and jellyfish or scavenged on floating carcasses as well, like modern turtles.

Classification 
The classification of Protostega was complicated at best. The specimen that Cope discovered in Kansas was hard to evaluate with the preservation condition. The fossil shared many characteristics with two other recorded genus named Dermochelys and Chelonidae. Cope wrote about the characteristics that distinctly separated this particular species from the two controversial groups. The differences he described were that the fossil had a reduced or lacking amount of dermal ossification on the back, the articulation of the pterygoid and quadrates, presplenial bone in the jaw was present, no articular process on the back side of the nuchal, simple formation of the radial process on the humerus and a peculiar bent formation of the xiphiplastra. He concluded that genus Protostega and species Protostega gigas was an intermediate form of the two groups Dermochelys and Chelonidae.

Paleobiology 
Examining the bone tissue microstructure (osteohistology) of the Protostega revealed growth patterns similar to modern leatherback sea turtles with rapid growth to large body size. Leatherbacks don't have a typical reptile metabolism, since they have high resting metabolic rates and can hold a body temperature higher than their surroundings. If Protostega had similar bone growth patterns to leatherbacks, it is hypothesized that they both had a similar metabolism. This rapid growth to adult body size in sea turtles would also indicate rapid growth to reproductive maturity, which would have been a great advantage in their survival. However, comparing Protostega to its more basal relative Desmatochelys shows that not all protostegids had the same growth patterns. This indicates that rapid growth to large size evolved late within the lineage, perhaps in response to the evolution of large mosasaurs like Tylosaurus. Given uncertainties in the phylogenetic placement of protostegids relative to living sea turtles, it is unclear if the evolution of rapid growth rates and possible elevated metabolism were convergent with modern leatherbacks or if the two were more closely related.

See also 

 List of Turtles
 Western Interior Seaway
 Late Cretaceous

References 

Protostegidae
Late Cretaceous turtles of North America
Prehistoric turtle genera
Taxa named by Edward Drinker Cope
Mooreville Chalk
Extinct turtles